ELA-2, short for Ensemble de Lancement Ariane 2 (French for Ariane Launch Area 2), was a launch pad at the Centre Spatial Guyanais in French Guiana. It was used by Arianespace for two Ariane 3 launches (V17 in 1986, V25 in 1988), the second Ariane 2 launch in 1987 (the 20th Ariane launch), and all 116 Ariane 4 launches between 1988 and 2003. Following the retirement of the Ariane 4 in favour of the Ariane 5, ELA-2 was deactivated. In September 2011 the pad's mobile service tower was demolished using explosives.

See also
ELA-1
ELA-3

References 

Guiana Space Centre